Aberystwyth Town Council (Welsh - Cyngor Tref Aberystwyth) is the community council that governs the ancient borough, town and community of Aberystwyth. For electoral purposes, it is divided into five electoral divisions (often known as wards).

Background
The council appoints a chairman as its presiding officer who is then known as the Mayor of Aberystwyth. The Town Council is now a statutory body, but it also holds the town's Borough Charter in trust, granted by King Edward I on 28 December 1277 and confirmed by successive monarchs, resulting in the members also being charter trustees.  Since the Municipal Corporations Act 1835 came into force, Aberystwyth's status as a borough has been wholly ceremonial.  The Local Government Act 1972 (in force from 1 April 1974) prevents the town council being known in name as a borough council as previously, although the town councillors as charter trustees can still, for example, take part in all of the ceremonial activities (wearing civic outfits), elect mayors (who can wear the chain of office) and organise markets (according to the original royal charter). The current Mayor of Aberystwyth is Talat Chaudhri; the Deputy Mayor for 2022-23 is Kerry Ferguson.

Aberystwyth town council comprises five wards - Bronglais, Central, North, Penparcau and Rheidol - electing between three and five town councillors each.

Clockwise, from the north, it borders the communities of Tirymynach, Faenor, Llanbadarn Fawr and Llanfarian.

Current composition

Election history
Aberystwyth town council is made up of 19 councillors elected from the five wards. The most recent elections were held in 2022. Plaid Cymru have an overall majority.

2022 election
The 2022 Aberystwyth town council elections were held alongside the elections for elections for Ceredigion County council on 5 May 2022. All 14 seats from the Bronglais, Central, North and Rheidol wards were up for election. There was no election in the Penparcau ward as there were only 2 candidates for the 5 seats representing the ward. The election resulted in 12 seats for Plaid Cymru, 2 for Labour, 1 for Liberal Democrats and 3 vacant seats.

2017 election
The 2017 Aberystwyth town council elections were held alongside the elections for Ceredigion County council on 4 May 2017. All 19 seats were up for election, which resulted in the election of 11 councillors for Plaid Cymru, 6 for the Welsh Liberal Democrats and 2 Welsh Labour councillors. One seat became vacant in May 2017, reducing the number held by the Welsh Liberal Democrats to 5. This position was filled by Brendan Somers in September 2017, bringing the total number of Plaid councillors up to 12. However, Councillor Brendan Somers resigned from Plaid Cymru on 30 April 2019 and now sits as an independent.

2012 election
The 2012 Aberystwyth town council elections were held alongside the elections for Ceredigion County council on 3 May 2012. All 19 seats were up for election.
The 2012 elections had previously resulted in 11 councillors for Plaid Cymru, 5 for the Welsh Lib Democrats and 3 independents. Lucy Teresa Huws (Plaid Cymru) was elected for Bronglais Ward in November 2013, replacing Christopher Griffiths. Brendan Somers (Plaid Cymru) joined for Central Ward in January 2014, replacing Carys Morgan (resigned 2013), and Dr Talat Zafar Chaudhri (Plaid Cymru) joined for Penparcau in September 2015, replacing Dylan Lewis (resigned 2015). There were subsequently 12 councillors for Plaid Cymru, 4 for the Welsh Liberal Democrats and 3 independents for the remainder of the term.

2008-2012 by-elections

2008 election
In the 2008 elections, 9 seats were won by Plaid Cymru, 6 by the Welsh Liberal Democrats, 2 by independents, 1 by Welsh Labour and 1 by the Green Party.

Mayoral history

References

External links
Aberystwyth Town Council

Aberystwyth
Community councils of Wales
Politics of Ceredigion